MV Aase Maersk or Aase Mærsk was a Danish  oil tanker. Odense Steel Shipyard of Odense built her in 1930 for A. P. Moller of Copenhagen. She was a motor ship, powered by a Burmeister & Wain six-cylinder four-stroke single-acting marine diesel engine developing 489 NHP.

Second World War
In the Second World War the UK Ministry of War Transport took her over and appointed C.T. Bowring & Co to manage her. She served with the United States Navy, Royal Australian Navy, and Royal Navy. The   collided with her on 11 November 1942. Aase Mærsk was returned to her owners in 1945.

Fate
Aase Mærsk was scrapped at Preston, Lancashire in December 1960.

Notes

References

1930 ships
Ministry of War Transport ships
Oil tankers
Ships built in Odense
Ships of the Maersk Line
Tankers of the Royal Australian Navy